Virginia Durr Moment is a phrase originating in developmental psychology which refers to an experience and "triggering event" which can foster the moral development of an individual.  Characteristic of the experience is a serious challenge to an individual's value system. The book Some Do Care by developmental psychologists William Damon and Anne Colby (who are husband and wife), use the experience of Virginia Foster Durr to describe this phenomenon.  Although Durr is known as a civil rights activist, in her early years she harbored racial prejudice—a result of her upbringing in the South. When Durr was a student at Wellesley College, her prejudiced value system was first seriously challenged.
On her first night at Wellesley, Durr refused to dine at the same table at which a Negro girl was sitting.  The head of the house explained that the rules of Wellesley College required Durr to dine with the girl for one month, and that if Durr did not comply, she would have to withdraw from the college.  As Damon and Colby explain "this was the first time Virginia's values had ever been seriously challenged and she stayed awake all night long worrying about the dilemma".  They later go on to quote Durr "That was the first time I became aware that my attitude was considered foolish by some people and that Wellesley College wasn't going to stand for it.  That experience had a tremendous effect on me." (pg, 99, Some Do Care).   The book Educating Citizens: Preparing America's Undergraduates for Lives of Moral and Civic Responsibility, also describes the developmental significance of Durr's challenge from Wellesley: "[T]he incident lodged in Virginia's memory, creat[ed] a fracture in her convictions about race that contributed to their later destruction" (pg. 3 Educating Citizens). 

A Virginia Durr Moment refers to those experiences which—when used correctly—foster moral development. A Virginia Durr Moment presents one with the opportunity for growth via the evolution of one's value system via seriously challenging one's value system in a manner which causes one to reflect on and, as a result of this reflection, reject it in whole or in part.  When used correctly, the signature causal sequence of a Virginia Durr Moment consists in: serious challenge-->self-reflection-->modification of value system-->moral development.  Ultimately, it is up to the individual to use the Moment to promote growth and further his/her moral development.   In the United Kingdom,  some circles understand Paul McCartney's Blackbird as describing the moral development fostered by the proper usage of a Virginia Durr Moment.  An individual may experience a Virginia Durr Moment and fail to use its power, thereby remaining in a condition of developmental stasis and moral immaturity.

References

Bibliography
Some Do Care: Contemporary Lives of Moral Commitment by Anne Colby and William Damon (1992; New York: Free Press).  
Outside the Magic Circle: The Autobiography of Virginia Foster Durr, edited by Hollinger F. Barnard (1985; New York: Simon & Schuster/Touchstone, 1987).  
Educating Citizens: Preparing America's Undergraduates for Lives of Moral and Civic Responsibility, by Anne Colby, Thomas Ehrlic, Elizabeth Beaumont and Jason Stephens (2003; San Francisco: Josey-Bass/Carnegie Foundation for the Advancement of Teaching).

External links

Developmental psychology
Behavioural sciences